Ikast FC is an association football club based in the town of Ikast, Denmark, that competes in the Series 1, the sixth tier of the Danish football league system and the second tier of the regional DBU Jutland. Founded in 2018 as a superstructure of between the amateur departments of Ikast FS and Ikast KFUM, it is affiliated to FC Midtjylland, which is itself a superstructure established in 1999 between the professional departments of Ikast FS and Herning Fremad. The team plays its home matches at Wunderelf Arena where it has been based since its foundation.

Ikast FS, one part of the merger, were Danish Cup finalists three times, in 1986, 1989 and 1997.

Achievements

17 seasons in the Highest Danish League
21 seasons in the Second Highest Danish League
8 seasons in the Third Highest Danish League

References

External links
  

 
Football clubs in Denmark
Association football clubs established in 1935
Ikast-Brande Municipality
1935 establishments in Denmark